Chris Oliver (born 9 July 1982) is an Australian rules footballer who played with St Kilda in the Australian Football League (AFL).

Early years
Oliver attended St Gregory's College as a teenager, but completed his schooling at Erindale College in Canberra. He played representative football for the NSW/ACT Rams.

AFL career
A ruckman, he spent a pre-season with Fremantle, prior to being recruited by St Kilda, as a rookie. He made 10 appearances for St Kilda over three seasons, never playing more than two games in a row. Instead he spent much of his time playing for Springvale in the Victorian Football League.

Post AFL
Oliver was delisted at the end of the 2003 season. He spent the next stage of his career with South Australian National Football League (SANFL) club Sturt, followed by a stint with Frankston in the Victorian Football League (VFL). He was at Corowa-Rutherglen in 2010, St Albans in 2011 and joined Numurkah in 2012.

References

1982 births
Living people
Australian rules footballers from New South Wales
St Kilda Football Club players
Sturt Football Club players
Frankston Football Club players
Corowa-Rutherglen Football Club players
NSW/ACT Rams players
Numurkah Football Club players